The Sunday Telegraph is an Australian tabloid newspaper, the separately published Sunday edition of The Daily Telegraph. It is available throughout Sydney, across most of regional and remote New South Wales, the Australian Capital Territory and South East Queensland. , The Sunday Telegraph is Australia's biggest selling newspaper.

History 

The Sunday Telegraph was founded in 1939 by Frank Packer, as the weekend version of the Daily Telegraph, which he had acquired in 1936. On its first front page it reported on Nazi Germany's oppression of the Czechs, after the Nazi invasion of Czechoslovakia in 1938. The first editor was Cyril Pearl who worked with the editor of the Daily Telegraph Brian Penton to fight against government censorship during the war.

Publication 
The Sunday Telegraph is produced in the Holt Street offices of Nationwide News, an Australian subsidiary of Rupert Murdochs News Corp. It is printed at the Chullora and Gold Coast printing presses and distributed across New South Wales, Canberra and South East Queensland.

Structure 
The Sunday Telegraph is a tabloid style newspaper, with a strong emphasis on family and giveaways. The newspaper contains five distinct sections as well as five liftouts.

Sections 
 News – breaking news and investigative journalism from around Australia.
 World – news from around the globe.
 Sport – features sport news from around Australia and the world (also includes The Punter, a racing liftout.)
 Insider – the back pages of the newspaper, featuring gossip and celebrity news.

Liftouts 
 Body+Soul – a health and lifestyle magazine with an emphasis on women.
 Stellar – a glossy liftout featuring interviews, fashion and delicious on Sunday food section.
 Escape – a large travel magazine featuring stories and travel deals.
 TV Guide – features television guide and entertainment news and reviews.

Editor 
The current editor is Mick Carroll (former deputy editor of The Daily Telegraph and editor of the Townsville Bulletin) who has edited the paper since 2012. Carroll also became editor of The Saturday Telegraph in 2019.

Accolades 
In addition to being Australia's most widely read newspaper, The Sunday Telegraph won News Limited's Newspaper of the Year Award at the 2011 News Awards.

External links
 

Newspapers published in New South Wales
Weekly newspapers published in Australia